John Thomas Eugene Talley Jr. (born December 19, 1964) is a former wide receiver and tight end who played in the National Football League. He played college football at West Virginia.

College career
Talley spent four seasons as a member of the West Virginia Mountaineers and originally played quarterback. He started several games for the Mountaineers as a sophomore in 1985 and became the second African-American to start at quarterback in the school's history, completing 53 of 109 passes for 507 yards with four touchdowns and seven interceptions while also rushing for 181 yards and two touchdowns. He moved to wide receiver during his junior season. As a senior, Talley had 25 receptions for 307 yards and two touchdowns.

Professional career
Talley was a member of the Philadelphia Eagles and the Miami Dolphins during the 1988 preseason, but did not make either team's active roster. He spent the 1989 season with the Cleveland Browns practice squad after being waived from the active roster at the end of the preseason. He played in 14 games as a wide receiver and tight end with two starts the following season, catching two passes for 28 yards. He played in three games during the 1991 season with one reception for 13 yards before he was placed on injured reserve in early November. Talley was waived by the Browns after the 1991 season.

Personal
Talley is the younger brother of College Football Hall of Famer and former All-Pro Linebacker Darryl Talley. Talley now resides in Brunswick, Ohio.

References

1964 births
Living people
American football wide receivers
West Virginia Mountaineers football players
Players of American football from Cleveland
Cleveland Browns players
American football quarterbacks